Dunglow Lough, also known as Dungloe Lough, is a freshwater lake in the northwest of Ireland. It is located in north County Donegal in the Rosses fishery.

Geography
The lake has five named islands.

Hydrology
Dunglow Lough is fed on its eastern side by neighbouring Lough Craghy. The lake drains westwards into the Dungloe River.

Natural history
Fish species in Dunglow Lough include brown trout, salmon and the critically endangered European eel.

See also
List of loughs in Ireland

References

Dunglow
Dunglow